East Timor has some of the best dive sites in the world due to its location, warm waters, minimalist tourist trade and lack of commercial fishing or heavy industry.

Situated in the Coral Triangle, Timor is surrounded by deep water (about 2,500m between Liquiçá and Alor Island, Indonesia) that gives home to coral and fish life, including the annual migration of whales through the Ombai Strait and Wetar Strait.

See also

 Shipwrecks of East Timor

References

External links

 Timor Divers Network at Congo-Pages.org
 Admiralty EasyTide Tidal Predictions for Dili
 Wikimedia Commons – Images of marine animals of Timor-Leste
 Nudibranch Species from Timor-Leste

East Timor
Tourist attractions in East Timor